The Siciliano indigeno is a breed of horse from Sicily resulting for the admixture of Oriental and African Horses, with the contribution of African Horses being the greatest.  Spanish and Norman horses also contributed to the formation of the Breed

Area of origin:  Val Demone (Nebrodi)  Val di Mazzara  (Madonie and Palermo area), Agrigento Province, Val di Noto (Syracuse and Ragusa and Iblei Mountains)
						
Height at the withers :        Stallions:  155-160 cm          Mares:   153-158 cm
Chest Circumference 	       Stallions:  178-185 cm	     Mares:    175-187 cm
Cannon bone circumference        18-21  cm

The horse is well represented with perhaps 8,000 specimens living in Sicily today. The Siciliano Indigeno is also being used by mounted regiments of the Carabinieri police force, as it is an ideal cavalry horse. The Sicilian horse was considered to be one of the best cavalry horses during the period of the Great Italian Wars and was praised in the treatise "Il Cavallarizzo" written by Claudio Corte in 1562 a few years after the end of the Great Italian wars. The breeding association has declared that only horses born in Sicily will be considered for registration as “Siciliano Indigeno”. This policy virtually guarantees that the horse will not become of International or even national significance, as it will be impossible to breed outside of Sicily. This is perceived by the breed's admirers as an unfortunate decision, because the animals are considered beautiful and useful.

References

 Siciliano Indigeno Video #1 
Siciliano Indigeno-Video #2

Horse breeds
Horse breeds originating in Italy